Live and Electric at The Union Chapel is a live album by All About Eve, recorded at their Union Chapel concert on 9 December 2000. It was released as both a standard version, and as a limited edition double CD, the second CD containing three more tracks from the same concert.

Track listing
"Lady Moonlight"
"Freeze"
"Wishing the Hours Away"
"Martha's Harbour"
"Wild Hearted Woman"
"In the Clouds"
"Miss World"
"Are You Lonely"
"December"
"Forever"
"More Than the Blues"
"You Bring Your Love to Me"
"Shelter from the Rain"
"What Kind of Fool"
"Outshine the Sun"

The second CD contains:
"Never Promise Anyone Forever"
"Scarlet"
"Farewell Mr. Sorrow"

Notes

On the second CD, the track listing on the CD insert for Scarlet and Never Promise Anyone Forever are incorrectly transposed.

All About Eve (band) live albums
2001 live albums